John Hardhead (fl. 1411–1420) was an English politician.

Life
The Hardheads had become a well-known family in Newcastle-under-Lyme, Staffordshire. In June 1411, along with others including John Mynors (MP for Newcastle-under-Lyme and Staffordshire), Hardhead was arrested for a murder in Featherstone, Staffordshire and armed assaults against many people in Wolverhampton. He was eventually absolved in May 1415, after refusing to attend court on many occasions.

Career
Hardhead was Member of Parliament for Newcastle-under-Lyme in 1420.

References

Year of birth unknown
Year of death missing
14th-century births
15th-century deaths
English MPs 1420
Members of the Parliament of England for Newcastle-under-Lyme